Playboy Club may refer to:
 Playboy Club, a chain of nightclubs operated by Playboy Enterprises between 1960 and 1991
 Playboy Club (Las Vegas), a revival of the chain at the Palms Casino Resort
 The Playboy Club, an American television series broadcast on NBC

See also